Accles & Shelvoke is a company based in the English Midlands, founded in 1903 by James George Accles and James Shelvoke as Bennett's Successors Ltd, adopting its present name in 1913. It is a manufacturer of humane slaughtering pistols, and has developed them since the early twentieth century. Since 1952 it has also manufactured cable spikers, used to ensure high-voltage electrical cables are de-energised prior to working on them. In 2017, the company was acquired by Frontmatec.

See also
Accles & Pollock another Accles company
Accles-Turrell automobile

References

External links
  (previous company website)

Firearm manufacturers of the United Kingdom